Miss Chauffeur is a 1928 German comedy film directed by Jaap Speyer and starring Mady Christians, Johannes Riemann, and Lotte Lorring. It was shot at the Terra Studios in Berlin. The film's sets were designed and part directed by the art director Hans Jacoby.

Cast

References

Bibliography

External links

1928 films
Films of the Weimar Republic
Films directed by Jaap Speyer
German silent feature films
Terra Film films
German black-and-white films
1928 comedy films
German comedy films
Silent comedy films
1920s German films
Films shot at Terra Studios